The UK Rock & Metal Albums Chart is a record chart which ranks the best-selling rock and heavy metal albums in the United Kingdom. Compiled and published by the Official Charts Company, the data is based on each album's weekly physical sales, digital downloads and streams. In 2017, there were 32 albums that topped the 52 published charts. The first number-one album of the year was Metallica's tenth studio album Hardwired... to Self-Destruct, which had been at the top of the chart since 1 December 2016. The final number-one album of the year was the live album One More Light Live by American alternative rock band Linkin Park.

The most successful album on the UK Rock & Metal Albums Chart in 2017 was Concrete and Gold by American alternative rock band Foo Fighters, which spent a total of eight weeks at number one. How Did We Get So Dark?, the second studio album by Royal Blood, spent five weeks at number one; Thunder's Rip It Up and Queens of the Stone Age's Villains were each number one for three weeks; and five albums – Night People by You Me at Six, Return to Ommadawn by Mike Oldfield, Infinite by Deep Purple, Is This the Life We Really Want? by Roger Waters and Paranormal by Alice Cooper – all spent two weeks at number one during the year.

Chart history

See also
2017 in British music
List of UK Rock & Metal Singles Chart number ones of 2017

References

External links
Official UK Rock & Metal Albums Chart Top 40 at the Official Charts Company
The Official UK Top 40 Rock Albums at BBC Radio 1

2017 in British music
United Kingdom Rock and Metal Albums
2017